Audouville-la-Hubert is a commune in the Manche department in the Normandy region in northwestern France.

History
In 1944, thirty German prisoners of war were massacred near the village of Audouville-la-Hubert by American paratroopers in an act of revenge after they suffered a high number of casualties during the Battle of Normandy.

Population

See also
Communes of the Manche department

References

Communes of Manche
World War II prisoner of war massacres by the United States
Mass murder in 1944

War crimes by the United States during World War II